"There Is No Ending" is a song by Scottish post-folk indie band Arab Strap. It was first released on Arab Strap's 2006 album, The Last Romance, and later as a 7" single limited to 1000 copies, both released in 2006 on Chemikal Underground.

Track listing 
Songs and lyrics by Aidan Moffat and Malcolm Middleton.
 7" (CHEM094)
"There Is No Ending" – 4:09
"The First Big Weekend  (Four Tet remix)" – 4:43

 Promo CD (PCHEM094CD)
"There Is No Ending" – 4:09

Personnel 
 Aidan Moffat – vocals
 Malcolm Middleton – guitar
 Alan Wylie – trumpet
 Jenny Reeve – violin
 Andrew Savage – vocals
 Geoff Allan – vocals, producer
 Jon McCue – vocals
 Paul Savage – producer

Notes

External links 
"There Is No Ending" on Last.fm

2006 singles
2005 songs